Uroš Ćosić (born 24 October 1992) is a Serbian professional footballer who plays as a centre back for IMT.

Club career
Uroš Ćosić was born on October 24, 1992 in Belgrade and he made his first steps in football at the youth academies of Red Star Belgrade. At the age of 17 he transferred to CSKA Moscow and then he moved back to Red Star on loan. In 2013 he moved to Pescara. 
During his spell at the Italian club he also had a loan transfer to Frosinone. In the season 2016–17, Ćosic was playing for Italian Serie A club Empoli.

AEK Athens
On 2 July 2017, AEK Athens and Empoli have reached an agreement for the transfer move of the Serbian central defender to the Super League Greece club. The 25-year-old former player of Red Star Belgrade, Pescara and Frosinone, who made 14 performances during 2016–17 season at Serie A with the struggling Italian team, is expected in Athens in order to complete the final details of deal and sign his four-season contract with AEK. On 3 July 2017, after successfully passing his medicals he put pen to paper to a three (plus one) years' contract. AEK paid €500,000 to acquire Ćosić from Empoli, which has a resale rate of 25%.

On 2 August 2017 he made his official debut in a 1–0 away defeat against CSKA Moscow for the second leg of the Champions League third qualifying round. On 24 September 2017 he was sent-off, after an altercation with Bjorn Engels in a dramatic 3–2 home win against Olympiacos. Five days later both players were suspended with a two-match ban. On mid November faced an ankle problem that will keep him out of action for 2–3 weeks. At the end of February 2018, Ćosić have to undergo surgery at his stomach muscles and initial estimations showed that he will miss the rest of 2017–18 season.

On 5 April 2018, central defender Uroš Ćosić completed AEK's training and seem ready to return in action. The 25-year-old Serbian remain out of action since last November, but he will manage to perform at the last five matches of experienced Spanish manager Manolo Jimenez's team at the domestic competitions until the end of 2017–18 season, in its club effort to win the Super League title.

Universitatea Craiova 
On 2 September 2019 he signed a contract with Liga I side Universitatea Craiova for 3 year with an option for another 1 year.

International career
Ćosić has already played for the Serbia U-19 team and has been selected in early 2011 for the Serbia U-21 team.

Honours
Red Star Belgrade
Serbian Cup (1): 2011–12
AEK Athens
Super League Greece (1): 2017–18

Career statistics

References

External links
 Uroš Ćosić Stats at Utakmica.rs
 

1992 births
Living people
Footballers from Belgrade
Serbian footballers
Association football defenders
Serbia youth international footballers
Serbia under-21 international footballers
Red Star Belgrade footballers
PFC CSKA Moscow players
Delfino Pescara 1936 players
Frosinone Calcio players
Empoli F.C. players
AEK Athens F.C. players
CS Universitatea Craiova players
FC Shakhtyor Soligorsk players
Athlitiki Enosi Larissa F.C. players
PAEEK players
FK IMT players
Serbian SuperLiga players
Serie A players
Serie B players
Super League Greece players
Liga I players
Serbian expatriate footballers
Expatriate footballers in Russia
Expatriate footballers in Italy
Expatriate footballers in Greece
Expatriate footballers in Romania
Expatriate footballers in Belarus
Expatriate footballers in Cyprus